Givira carla is a moth in the family Cossidae. It is found in North America, where it has been recorded from California and Arizona.

References

Natural History Museum Lepidoptera generic names catalog

Givira
Moths described in 1923